The 49th International Emmy Awards ceremony took place on November 22, 2021 at Casa Cipriani in New York City, recognizing excellence in television programs produced and aired originally outside the U.S., and non-English language US primetime program between the dates of January 1, 2020 and December 31, 2020. 

The nominations were announced on September 23, 2021.

The ceremony was hosted by Yvonne Orji, with presenters Vanessa Williams, Method Man, Joshua Jackson, Brian Cox, Piper Perabo, Danielle Moné Truitt, Chiké Okonkwo, Aidan Quinn, Brian d'Arcy James, Emeraude Toubia, Luciano Huck, Felipe Santana, Henning Baum and Angélica. Former NBA star Dirk Nowitzki presented the Directorate Award to Thomas Bellut, managing director of German public broadcaster ZDF.

Eligibility
The 49th International Emmy Awards Competition was opened for all categories December 9, 2020 and closed February 17, 2021.

Ceremony
Nominations for the 49th International Emmy Awards were announced in September 23, 2021 by the International Academy of Television Arts & Sciences (IATAS). Nominees come from Argentina, Belgium, Brazil, Canada, Chile, China, Colombia, Egypt, France, India, Israel, Japan, Lebanon, Mexico, the Netherlands, New Zealand, Norway, Portugal, Singapore, South Korea, Spain, Thailand, the United Kingdom and the United States.

The International Academy also presented one special award. Thomas Bellut, director of the TV channel ZDF, received the Directorate Award.

Broadcast
The 49th International Emmy Awards Gala was live-streamed on the International Academy’s website (iemmy.tv) from 7 pm Eastern Time.

Winners and nominees

Multiple wins

Multiple nominations

References

External links 
 International Academy of Television Arts and Sciences website

International Emmy Awards ceremonies
International Emmy Awards
International Emmy Awards
International Emmy Awards
International Emmy Awards
International Emmy Awards